Yang Sen (20 February 1884 – 15 May 1977) was a warlord and general of the Sichuan clique who had a long military career in China. Although he was a provincial warlord, he loyally served Chiang Kai-shek and his Kuomintang (KMT) government, especially during the Second Sino-Japanese War. He also served as governor of Sichuan and Guizhou provinces. After the Communists defeated the KMT in the Chinese Civil War, he retreated with the KMT government to Taiwan.

He was also known as a Taoist master and had numerous wives, concubines and children. He published a book about the supercentenarian Li Ching-yuen, who supposedly lived 197 or 256 years.

Biography
 1924–24 Governor of Sichuan Province
 1924–25—Military-Governor of Sichuan Province
 1926   -Wanhsien Incident, combat with British patrol vessels on the river Yangtse
 1933–38—General Officer Commanding XX Corps
 1938–44—Commander in Chief 27th Army Group
 1939–40—Deputy Commander in Chief 6th War Area
 1940–45—Deputy Commander in Chief 9th War Area
 1945–48—Chairman of the Government of Guizhou Province
 1949—moved to Taiwan during the Nationalist exodus from the mainland
 1950s—An avid sports person, he was the Republic of China's Olympic Committee Chairman and at the Olympic Games in Mexico carried the national flag of Taiwan, Republic of China in the opening ceremony. He was a well-known mountaineer and the Chairman of the Taiwan Mountain Climbing Association as well. He had 12 wives and 43 children at least.

Meeting Master Li Ching Yuen
General Yang knew the Taoist Master Li Ching-yuen personally and became his disciple, practicing his teaching until the end of his life.

In 1927 he invited him to his residence in Wanxian, Sichuan. After his master's death, General Yang wrote the report "A Factual Account of the 250 Year-Old Good-Luck Man.", where he described Li Ching Yuen's appearance:
"He has good eyesight and a brisk stride; Li stands seven feet tall, has very long fingernails, and a ruddy complexion."

The Tai Chi Chuan Master T. T. Liang (Liang Tung Tsai) learned from General Yang the practice of the "Eight Brocade Qigong". His student Stuart Alve Olson wrote in 2002 the book "Qigong Teachings of a Taoist Immortal: The Eight Essential Exercises of Master Li Ching-Yun", taking General Yang's report as reference.

See also
 Order of battle of Battle of Wuhan
 Warlord Era

References

 Daniel Reid, "Tao of Health, Sex, and Longevity.", Fireside, New York, 1989, pp. 345–349. 
 Hsu Long-hsuen and Chang Ming-kai, "History of The Sino-Japanese War (1937–1945)." 2nd Ed., 1971. Translated by Wen Ha-hsiung, Chung Wu Publishing; 33, 140th Lane, Tung-hwa Street, Taipei, Taiwan Republic of China.
 OLSON, Stuart Alve. "Qigong Teachings of a Taoist Immortal: The Eight Essential Exercises of Master Li Ching-yun." Healing Arts Press, 2002. 
 Yang Sen. "A Factual Account of the 250 Year-Old Good-Luck Man." (一个250岁长寿老人的真实记载). Published by the Chinese and Foreign Literature Storehouse, Taipei, Taiwan.

1884 births
1977 deaths
Republic of China warlords from Sichuan
Governors of Sichuan
Politicians from Guang'an
Politicians of Taiwan
Republic of China Taoists
Chinese Civil War refugees
Taiwanese people from Sichuan